Mark Joffe (born 1956) is an Australian film and television director. He has directed feature films, telemovies, and drama series.

Joffe "learned his trade at Crawford Productions", working on Carson's Law, Special Squad and Neighbours. His first major directing job was the first episode of The Great Bookie Robbery (1986).

He agreed to direct the Irish-American film The Matchmaker after gaining approval to have the script rewritten by Irish writer Graham Linehan, one of the writers of Father Ted.

Awards
In 1987 Joffe won the Australian Film Institute award for Best Direction in Television for The Great Bookie Robbery. In 1991 he won the Peace Prize at the Chicago International Children's Film Festival for More Winners: Boy Soldiers. In 1992 he was nominated for the Crystal Globe at the Karlovy Vary International Film Festival for Spotswood.

Filmography
Feature films

Working Class Boy (documentary) (2018)
Dripping in Chocolate (2012)
The Man Who Sued God (2001)
The Matchmaker (1997)
Cosi (1996)
Spotswood (1992)
Grievous Bodily Harm (1988)

Television

The House of Hancock (2015)
A Place to Call Home (2014)
Wild Boys (2011)
More Winners: Boy Soldiers (1990)
Shadow of the Cobra (1989)
Nightmaster (1988)
The Great Bookie Robbery (1986)
The Fast Lane (1986)
Neighbours (1985)
Special Squad (1985)
Carson's Law (1983)
Skin Deep (1983)
Holiday Island (1981)

See also
Cinema of Australia

References

External links

Australian film directors
1956 births
Living people